André Antoine Brugiroux (born 11 November 1937) is a French traveller and author who, between 1955 and 2005, visited every country and territory in the world, the last being Mustang. He was named "greatest living traveller on earth" in 2007 in Jorge Sánchez's list of Viajeros notables contemporaneous (Notable Contemporary Travellers). He has made a documentary film of his first, 18-year trip and has devoted his life to spreading the message of the Baháʼí Faith worldwide.

Biography
Brugiroux was born in Villeneuve-Saint-Georges, Val-de-Marne, in the outskirts of Paris, to a railwayman father and an accountant mother. He spent his childhood in Brunoy, Seine-et-Oise and attended the Mardelles school in Brunoy and then the Saint-Augustin collège (secondary school) in Montgeron. Lack of work on the family farm in Langeac, Haute-Loire had led his father to move to the Paris region.

It was not his father who encouraged him to travel, however, but rather his mother, who had done some touring before getting married. She unwittingly gave him his taste for travel and provided him with the key to developing his future resourcefulness by enrolling him as a scout. The name he received as a scout was incredibly apt: "fouine babillarde" (in French), or "chattering beech marten" (a beech marten is a cunning animal and chattering means "talkative")

Growing up in wartime made such an impression on him from his early childhood that his decision to travel the world was unconsciously inspired by the desire to find out whether peace might one day be possible.

Travels

Brugiroux left home in 1955, at the age of 17, with a diploma from the École hôtelière de Paris and ten francs in his pocket, working first for seven years in Europe to learn various foreign languages by doing part-time jobs. Between his time in Spain and West Germany he did his military service in the Congo (1958 and 1959).

Then, after working as a translator in Canada for three years (from 1965 to 1967) to save up the funds, he managed to visit the whole planet over six years without working. He travelled only by hitchhiking (including by plane, ship and yacht), spending no more than an average of one dollar a day.

During his travels he was imprisoned seven times, almost killed on several occasions, deported and robbed. He stayed with Dr. Schweitzer at his hospital in Lambaréné (Gabon) and the hippies in San Francisco, with head-hunters in Borneo and Buddhist monks in Bangkok; he studied Yoga at an ashram in India and worked on a kibbutz in Israel; he also saw, among other things, the gem-smuggling business in Ceylon (now Sri Lanka) and refugee camps in Cambodia.
 
In the course of his journey, he discovered and accepted an idea extolled in the nineteenth century by a Persian noble named Baháʼu'lláh: "The Earth is but one country." He returned home with a new vision of history.

After publishing his first book, producing a documentary film of his first trip and recovering his health, Brugiroux hit the road again in order not only to visit the countries he had missed the first time round and their peoples but to share the Baháʼí principles and teachings he had learnt. He travelled abroad from his base in France continuously for the next 30 years, spending six to eight months away each year and combining lectures with visiting new places. He has also travelled all over France.

In 1984 he married Rinia Van Kanten, a sociologist from Suriname whom he had met in Cayenne (French Guiana).  They have a daughter named Natascha.

In 2005, Brugiroux completed his dream of seeing the whole world by watching polar bears in the bay at Churchill, Manitoba (Canada).

Since then, Brugiroux has kept travelling to know more about the world and share his convictions. In 2007, he celebrated his 70th birthday on the island of Socotra (Yemen) with other travellers. In 2008, he finally enjoyed the last forbidden kingdom: Saudi Arabia. In 2009, in Siberia, he went down the Lena river and drove along the road of bones from Yakutz to Magadan with the greatest travellers on earth.

In 2011, he visited a brand-new country: South Sudan.
In 2013, he reached Tristan da Cunha, the remotest island in the world. Since then, in 2015 he entered Sascha Grabow's list GreatestGlobetrotters.com in 2nd position, and in 2016 Harry Mitsidis's Thebesttravelled22 in 6th position.

Publications
The title of both his film and his first book, La Terre n'est qu'un seul pays (literally: "The Earth is but one country", published in English as One People, One Planet), is the conclusion to which his first journey around the world brought him, a journey which lasted 18 years before he returned home (1955 to 1973), and during which he hitchhiked , hitchhiking through 135 countries on every continent.

Works

Books
In French unless stated:

 (The Earth is but one country), Robert Laffont, 1975, "Vécu" collection; republished in 2007 by Géorama éditions.
 
 (English)
 (The road and its pathways).
 (The Prisoner of Acre).
 (Pathways to Peace).
 (Notes of a Travelling Teacher).
 (A life on the road).
(The man who wanted to see all countries in the world).
(The world is my country).
(Victor Hugo and the new era).

Film
 La Terre n'est qu'un seul pays/One People, One Planet – a 400,000 km hitchhike around the globe visiting 135 countries and world civilization. This film is a documentary filmed at the time, produced and narrated by the author. Available on DVD (in French and English) since 2005.

References

 Sources
Interview with André Brugiroux: Great Modern Traveler awardee by Dave from The Longest Way Home ~ December 12, 2011
ANDRÉ BRUGIROUX HITCHHIKED 400.000 KM TO 135 COUNTRIES, October 29, 2012
André Brugiroux, un voyageur pur sang, By BeNoot
Andre Takes You Around the Planet: 249 Countries Visited,  April, 2009
He has visited every country on earth, jabimanyi, kfm.co.ug
Globe-Trotter and World Citizen: Andre Brugiroux and Baha'i Faith, 25 February 2001
He has visited every country on earth, by John K. Abimanyi, Feb 5, 2012

External links
André Brugiroux - official websitesite

1937 births
Living people
People from Villeneuve-Saint-Georges
French travel writers
French people imprisoned abroad
French Bahá'ís
20th-century Bahá'ís
21st-century Bahá'ís
French male non-fiction writers